The Afon Cerist is a small river that flows from underneath Craig Portas, the cliffs on the north side of Maesglase mountain, to meet the River Dyfi at Dinas Mawddwy. It forms the northern border of the Dyfi Hills.

References 

Rivers of Gwynedd
Rivers of Snowdonia
Mawddwy